Satrio Syam is an Indonesian footballer who plays as a defender who plays for Persiba Balikpapan.

Career 
In November 2015, he signed with SPFC.

References

External links 
 

Living people
1986 births
Indonesian footballers
Indonesia international footballers
Liga 1 (Indonesia) players
PSMS Medan players
Persebaya Surabaya players
PSM Makassar players
Persita Tangerang players
Pelita Bandung Raya players
Semen Padang F.C. players
Persiba Balikpapan players
Association football defenders